Charles Gustav Binderup (March 5, 1873 – August 19, 1950) was a Nebraska Democratic politician. He served as United States Congressman from 1935 to 1939.

Early life 
Binderup was born in Horsens, Denmark, son of George Werner Binderup and Laurentza Bjerring. When he was six months old, his parents immigrated to the United States, settling on a farm near Hastings, Nebraska. He attended Grand Island Business College and farmed near Hastings and Minden, Nebraska. He married Elena Westengaard on September 18, 1900, and they had three children.

Career 
Binderup was in the mercantile and creamery business in Minden.

Binderup was elected as a Democrat to the Seventy-fourth and Seventy-fifth Congresses and served from January 3, 1935 to January 3, 1939. He failed to be reelected in 1938. He ran as an Independent for the Seventy-seventh Congress but was defeated again. He helped organize the Constitutional Money League of America in Minden.

Death 
Binderup died in Minden on August 19, 1950 (age 77 years, 167 days), and is interred at Minden Cemetery. He was a Presbyterian.

References

External links

 
 

1873 births
1950 deaths
People from Minden, Nebraska
People from Hastings, Nebraska
American Presbyterians
Danish emigrants to the United States
People from Horsens
Democratic Party members of the United States House of Representatives from Nebraska
Nebraska Independents